BBL may refer to:

Banks 

 Bank Bruxelles Lambert, a Belgian bank, now merged into ING Group
 Bangkok Bank, a Thai commercial bank (Stock symbol: BBL)

Science and nature 

 Benthic boundary layer
 Bird Banding Laboratory
 Brazilian butt lift, a form of buttock augmentation using autologous fat injection

Sports and pastimes 

 Big Bash League, an Australian Twenty20 cricket tournament
 Baltic Basketball League
 Basketball Bundesliga
 British Basketball League
 Budweiser Basketball League, in which the BBL Championship was known as from 1993 to 1999
 British Bridge League

Transport
 Ballera Airport, IATA airport code "BBL"
 Bat & Ball railway station, Kent, England, National Rail station code "BBL"

Other 

 British Brothers' League, an anti-immigration organisation, 1901–1923
 BBL Pipeline from the Netherlands to England
 Borough, Block and Lot, New York City real estate identifier
 Bangsamoro Basic Law

bbl can refer to:
 abbreviation for a barrel (unit)
 abbreviation for automotive carburetor barrels
 acronym for "be back later", used mainly in electronic communication
 filename extension produced by BibTeX